David Fullerton Robison (May 28, 1816 – June 24, 1859) was an Opposition Party member of the U.S. House of Representatives from Pennsylvania.

Early life

David F. Robison (nephew of David Fullerton) was born in Antrim Township, Pennsylvania, near Greencastle, Pennsylvania.  He attended the public schools, taught school, studied law, was admitted to the Franklin County, Pennsylvania, bar in 1843 and commenced practice in Chambersburg.

United States House of Representatives

Robison was elected as an Opposition Party candidate to the Thirty-fourth Congress. He was not a candidate for renomination and continued to practice law in Chambersburg, where he died in 1859, from a disease contracted at a banquet at the National Hotel in Washington, D.C., during the inauguration of President James Buchanan. The illness was known as National Hotel disease. He was buried in Cedar Hill Cemetery in Greencastle.

Sources

David Fullerton Robison entry at The Political Graveyard

External links

 

1816 births
1859 deaths
People from Franklin County, Pennsylvania
Opposition Party members of the United States House of Representatives from Pennsylvania
Pennsylvania lawyers
19th-century American lawyers